Nebil Gahwagi (born 20 August 1989) is a Libyan-Hungarian football player. In 2009, he collapsed during a training session. In 2014, he left Hungary for England due to work reasons.

References

1989 births
Living people
Footballers from Budapest
Hungarian people of Libyan descent
Hungarian footballers
Association football midfielders
Tisza Volán SC footballers
Diósgyőri VTK players
Lombard-Pápa TFC footballers